Satyrium kingi, or King's hairstreak, is a species of hairstreak in the butterfly family Lycaenidae.

The MONA or Hodges number for Satyrium kingi is 4284.

References

Further reading

 

Eumaeini
Articles created by Qbugbot
Butterflies described in 1952